Wrestling at the 2015 Military World Games was held in Mungyeong, South Korea from 6 to 10 October 2015.

Medal summary

Men's freestyle

Men's Greco-Roman

Medal table

References

Results

External links
UWW Database
Official website

Wrestling
2019
Military World Games